Eleven Angels FC is a Botswanan football club based in Francistown that currently competes in the Botswana Premier League.

History
The club was founded in 2010 by Seemo Mpatane. He officially registered the club with the Botswana Football Association in 2013 in an effort to protect players and create revenue. That year Eleven Angels began play in the third division. For the 2017/18 season, the team won the Botswana Division One and qualified for the Botswana First Division North promotion playoffs. The team qualified for the Botswana Premier League for the first time following a successful promotion play-off against Mochudi Centre Chiefs SC in 2022.

References

External links
Official Facebook
Soccerway profile
Global Sports Archive profile

Association football clubs established in 1910
Football clubs in Botswana
Football clubs in Francistown